is a small town, once was an independent administrative division located in Tokoro District, Abashiri Subprefecture (now Okhotsk Subprefecture), Hokkaido, Japan. On March 5, 2006, the division, along with the towns of Rubeshibe and Tanno (all from Tokoro District), was merged into a part of the expanded city of Kitami, and became Tokoro Town, Kitami City.

Demographics
As of 2004, the town had an estimated population of 4,885 and a density of 17.55 persons per km2. The total area was 278.29 km2.

Curling
The town had a strong association with the sport of curling following a friendship visit in 1980 by a curling team from Alberta in Canada. An outdoor curling rink was built the following year, and it hosted the 1st NHK Cup Curling Championship. In January 1988, the town built a dedicated 5-lane curling hall, the first in Japan. This eventually closed in early 2013, replaced by a new, larger, all-year-round structure.

Curling was introduced in schools in Tokoro as part of the physical education curriculum, and the two produced a number of Olympic curlers. Five members of the Japanese curling team at the 1998 Winter Olympics in Nagano were from Tokoro, three members of the Japanese curling team at the 2006 Winter Olympics in Torino were from Tokoro, and three members of the Japanese curling team at the 2010 Winter Olympics in Vancouver were from Tokoro.

Climate

References

External links
 Kitami website 

Dissolved municipalities of Hokkaido
Kitami, Hokkaido